Ngana (Ŋaana)  is a small town in the arrondissement of Kignan, cercle and region of Sikasso, Republic of Mali.

References 

 4 ème Recensement Général de la Population et de l'Habitat du Mali (RGPH) 
 Communes de la Région de Sikasso

Populated places in Sikasso Region